Maleheh (also Romanized as Māleḩeh) is a village in Sorkheh Rural District, Fath Olmobin District, Shush County, Khuzestan Province, Iran. According to the 2006 census, its population was 452, in 61 families.

References 

Populated places in Shush County